Hendrik de Fromantiou (1633 – after 1693) was a Dutch still life painter.

Early life
Fromantiou was born in Maastricht.  In his youth, he produced works for the art dealer Gerrit van Uylenburgh in Amsterdam and from 1658, he was active in The Hague.

Career
In 1670, he was appointed as conservator of the royal collection in Potsdam. In 1671, when Van Uylenburgh tried to sell 13 paintings to Frederick William, Elector of Brandenburg, Fromantiou successfully advised the Elector to send 12 pieces back as forgeries. Fromantiou claimed the paintings were copies of Italian ones, and he could point out the originals in Holland. Included in the 51 people involved in the expertise, was Johannes Vermeer.

Personal life
In 1672 he married the daughter of the rich and successful fellow Dutch painter Philip Wouwerman.  He died in Potsdam.

Gallery

External links

Vermeer and His Milieu: A Web of Social History By John Michael Montias, page 207
Fromantiou at the Netherlands Institute for Art History

1633 births
1690s deaths
Dutch Golden Age painters
Dutch male painters
Dutch still life painters
Artists from Maastricht